The National Theatre is a theatre located in Belgrade, Serbia.

Founded in the later half of the 19th century, it is located on the Republic Square, at the corner of Vasina and Francuska Street. With the raising of this building as well as with the implementation of the Regulations Plan of Town in Trench by Josimović from 1867, the conditions were made for the formation of today's main Republic Square in Belgrade. Built back in 1868, the National Theatre, following the fate of its own people and the country, went through different phases of the architectural and artistic development, surviving as a symbol of Serbian culture, tradition and spirituality. Today, under its roof, there are three artistic ensembles: opera, ballet, and drama.

The National Theatre was declared a Monument of Culture of Great Importance in 1983, and it is protected by the Republic of Serbia.

Origin 

In 1868, the Serbian National Theatre from Novi Sad (then the capital of Serbian culture in Austria-Hungary) performed in Belgrade (then the capital of the Principality of Serbia). Prince Michael, impressed by the performances he experienced, invited Jovan Đorđević (the founder of the Novi Sad Serbian National Theatre) to found a similar institution in Serbia. Having accepted, Jovan Đorđević came to Belgrade with half of his company of actors and founded the National Theatre in Belgrade, seven years after having founded the Novi Sad theatre.

The prince chose the location, on the present Republic Square. The area was cleared earlier, after the prince ordered the demolition of the Stambol Gate in 1866, one of the four outer gates into the Belgrade Fortress.

Building

History

Construction 

Though some preparatory works have begun, the prince didn't live to see the full blown construction. On that day the Metropolitanate of Belgrade Mihailo Jovanović consecrated the foundations. A memorial charter was signed by the prince Milan and his regents and built into the foundations of the building. The charter had the following inscription: In the name of the Father, and of the Son, and of the Holy Spirit! This home, intended for the Serbian National Theater in Belgrade, first stage in Serbian capital city, is being built thanks to the will and significant money support from the Serbian prince Mihailo M. Obrenović III, who was assassinated by the villains in Topčider's Košutnjak on 29 May 1868. Foundation was laid by the Serbian prince Milan M. Obrenović IV, and consecrated and blessed in the church ceremony by the Archbishop of Belgrade and Metropolitan of all Serbia Mihailo, in the month of August, 19th day, 1868. The Lord shall count, when he writeth up the people, that this man was born there. The building was roofed the next January and ceremonially opened on 12 November 1869.

The edifice was built on the location of the former Stambol Gate. The theatrical company moved into the new building in 1869 and the first alterations and annexing happened already the next year. In 1870, the relatively small stage was upgraded and extended. The Great Constitutional Assembly adopted the famous 1888 Constitution in this building.

Interbellum 

Still, the condition of the stage and utility rooms caused further problems, so in 1911 a decision was made to do another reconstruction of the building. Works began, but due to the World War I had to be halted. The reconstruction continued in 1919 and was finished by 1922. The project was drafted by architect Josif Bukavac. After the reconstruction was finished, the outer appearance of the building lost its unity of decorative styles and the unison original concept of the Vienna Secession and Baroque architecture blend. The auditorium was enlarged to 944 seats, the stage was enlarged and deepened and the rotational round stage was added.

As the building was additionally damaged during the fighting in the war, during the reconstruction the ensemble performed in one of the buildings within the Royal Cavalry Guard complex, where the Manjež park was later built. The first performance in this new, temporary venue, was held in January 1920. Even though the reconstruction of the theatre was finished by July 1922, the offshoot at Manjež continued under the name of Theatre at Cvetni Trg, until 1927 when the old, wooden former horse stable burned to the ground. On that location today is situated the Yugoslav Drama Theatre.

World War II 

The theatre building was damaged during the German bombing of Belgrade on 6 April 1941. Ministry of the construction in the German-installed Serbian Government of National Salvation began the repairs by the end of 1941. Occupational German administration appointed staunch Nazi supporter Jovan Popović as a director who stated that his job is to show as many German plays as possible, selecting works of Gerhart Hauptmann, Paul Helwig and Mozart for the 1941/1942 season. As both the National Theatre building at the square, and the Manjež stage, were damaged, the performances were held in the building of the Ilija M. Kolarac Endowment. However, keeping the appearances of normal cultural life turned to be a tenuous situation for Popović, as the theatre was disastrously understaffed. Out of the pre-war employees, five were killed in the bombing, six were sent to camps, seven were dismissed for being Jews, Romanies and Freemasons, while numerous actors refused to work forming independent acting troops. Still, Popović systematically promoted Germanism, including special shows for Germans only, and introduction of German performers, like the chief conductor, Oswald Buchholz.

German military area commander for Belgrade, Oberst Ernst Moritz von Kaisenberg, ordered German soldiers to participate in the reconstruction and the reconstruction was finished in June 1942. German administration effectively managed the theatre, forcing the quisling government to create its own theatres for propaganda purposes, like Srbozor Theatre in the Nemanjina Street. The building was again enlarged and another annex was added adjoining the lower side of the edifice. This way, the monumental, symmetrical building, as it appeared in 1922, completely lost its architectural harmony. The reconstruction plans during the war were drafted by architect Gojko Todić and later by his colleague Dragan Gudović. Company of another architect, Milan Sekulić, was the general contractor. The building was also hit during the heavy "Easter Bombing" of Belgrade by the Allies on 16 April 1944.

Post-war period 

After the 1964-1965 season ended, another reconstruction began, based on the plan of the architect Nikola Šercer. It included minor refurbishments of the Main Stage. In 1986, the National Theatre and the City of Belgrade opted for the new, necessary and detailed reconstruction of the, by now, almost completely unusable venue. The main architects who headed the project were Ljubomir Zdravković and Slobodan Drinjaković. The interior was designed by Milan Pališaški, façade and ornamental plastic was done by Branka Bremec, Dimitrije Ivančević and Zoran Badnjević, while the engineer Milenko Popović was entrusted with solving the problem with statics. The reconstruction lasted for 3 years and cost $4,5 million.

The building was reopened in 1989, 120 years since it became operational. The building was fully reconstructed while the new annex was built in the direction of the Braće Jugovića Street, doubling the floor venue of the edifice. While the annex was built in the modern, glass style, the old section of the theatre actually regained its 1922 appearance. The annex has 5 floors above and 2 floors below the ground. The architects projected special places for the future connections between the annex, now called the Working Building, and the possible new Opera and Ballet building on the Square Republic, across the Francuska Street.

In August 2018 another reconstruction began. The façade will be reconstructed (removal of the parts prone to falling off, filling of the holes and damaged sections with the façade stone, replacement of the glass panels, etc.). Additionally, some interior works will be done, too, mostly concerning the reparation of the chairs and seats. The works should be finished by January 2019.

Events of 1999 

During one of the toughest times in Serbian history, which is the 1999 NATO bombing, this theatre was the only one to open its doors to the public during the 78-day air raids. For only 1 dinar, opera, plays and ballets were performed to the public. The performance times were very unusual, from 15:00 to 18:00. It was done because in that period of time there were not NATO air strikes on Belgrade. World well-known opera conductor, maestro Alberto Zedda, said once that during those horrible days Belgrade Opera was proudly writing the most dignified pages of history of world opera.

Characteristics 

The National Theatre was built according to the design of Aleksandar Bugarski, the most productive architect of Belgrade in the 19th century. The building was a typical theatre building at the time and was particularly reminiscent of La Scala, in Milan, with regard to its Renaissance conception and the decorative finish. Beside theatrical purposes, the hall has been used for charity balls and concerts during the 19th century.

Performance facilities 

The National Theatre Belgrade has 2 halls for performing arts.

 Main Stage

The Grand Hall has 3 levels. The ground level has 219 seats in total with the seats at the front being most expensive. There are 3 balconies in the theatre with the first one being the most expensive.

Large operas, dramas and ballets are presented at the Grand Hall.

 Raša Plaović Stage

Raša Plaović has 281 seats and with no balconies. It is much smaller and less beautiful then the Grand Hall. Smaller scale dramas are played out on this stage.

Drama, opera, ballet

Drama 

The activity of Drama of the National Theatre can be viewed as a development in four stages: from 1868 till 1914, from 1918 till 1941, from 1945 until 1991, and from 1991 till today. The first stage is marked by many tragedies and enactments inspired by medieval and modern history, like The Death of Uroš V by Stefan Stefanović. The characteristic of the repertoire of the National Theatre, especially at the end of the 19th century were plays with singing like dramatizations of Stevan Sremac’s popular short stories: Zona Zamfirova and Ivkova Slava.

In the first two decades of the 20th century the broadening of subject matters was noticeable. Beside Branislav Nušić others like Simo Matavulj, Vojislav Jovanović Marambo, Nikola Živković Mirabo and Milivoj Predić must be mentioned. Koštana by Borisav Stanković was first shown at the very beginning of the 20th century and it has remained the cult performance of this theatre till this day. In the first stage on the repertoire of the National Theatre were plays written by the most significant writers of all periods: from the earliest (Sophocles), to William Shakespeare, Pedro Calderón de la Barca, Molière, Jean Racine, Carlo Goldoni, Edmond Rostand, Johann Wolfgang von Goethe, Henrik Ibsen, August Strindberg, Nikolai Gogol, Aleksandr Ostrovsky, Anton Chekhov and Maxim Gorky.

Between the two world wars, speaking of domestic dramaturgy, the plays of Jovan Sterija Popović, Branislav Nušić, Milutin Bojić, Borisav Stanković, Ivo Vojnović, Milan Begović, Ivan Cankar and Todor Manojlović were staged.

In the period from 1945 till 1953 the plays with clear political message were played. Political changes and certain liberalization characterise the relationship towards the foreign dramaturgy and discovering of the American drama and the works of Eugène Ionesco and Samuel Beckett.

The National Theatre opened its door to the contemporary world dramaturgy. Plays by Martin McDonagh, Éric-Emmanuel Schmitt, Nina Valsa, Yasmina Reza, Pavel Kohout are played and plays by Serbian contemporary writers Siniša Kovačević, Vida Ognjenović, Jelena Kajgo, Miloš Nikolić,  can be seen on the stage of the National Theatre.

Opera 

The music ensemble of the National Theatre in Belgrade worked towards being a professional opera ensemble from 1882. The present chief conductor is Dejan Savić, and the principal concertmaster is Edit Makedonska.

As an independent ensemble, the Opera of the National Theatre began its work in 1919. On 11 February 1919, under the leadership of the first music director of the Opera Section of the National Theatre, Stanislav Binički, a conductor, the opera Madam Butterfly by Giacomo Puccini, was performed. The first opera performances were received very favourably, most of them were operas by Italian composers (Gioacchino Rossini, Giuseppe Verdi), while Serbian music was represented by the works of Stevan Hristić (The Sunset), and Petar Konjović (Prince of Zeta).

In the ten years 1924 to 1933 Stevan Hristić was the director of the Belgrade Opera. This period marked an expansion of the repertoire and the first tour abroad.

After the Second World War, conductor Oskar Danon quickly renewed the activities of the Opera as its general manager. Special attention was dedicated to the domestic opera composers.

The golden period of the Belgrade Opera saw significant development and international affirmation of the Serbian operatic art. Starting in 1954 with a very successful performance of Boris Godunov by Modest Mussorgsky in Switzerland as a part of a concert cycle "Clubhouse", and gramophone recordings of seven major Russian operas for Decca. The Decca series was supported by Gerald Severn, an émigré White Russian. The venue found in the then Yugoslav capital for the first batch of recordings was the cinema in the Dom Kulture ("House of culture") complex, but which could only be used after the last film of the day (around 11 p.m.) so sessions took place at night. Prince Igor and Khovanschina were recorded in February 1955, with Eugene Onegin, Life for the Tsar, Snow Maiden and Queen of Spades in September and October that year, all among the early Decca stereo records. The company's recording of Boris Godunov took place in Zagreb between the other sets of sessions.

The culmination of this "golden period" was an outstanding production of Mazeppa by Peter Ilyich Tchaikovsky on the stage of the Theater des Westens in West Berlin. The most eminent foreign critics pointed out the wholeness of the performance, good teamwork and the beauty of the performing, outstanding soloist creations, acoustic superiority, the homogeneity of the choir and the professional playing of the orchestra of the National Theatre from Belgrade. The opera has attracted talented musicians, including Sándor Szabó and others.

Ballet 
Ballet has always been a great part of the National Theatre Belgrade. One of its most important and most watched ballet performances is the Swan Lake. Ballet of the National Theatre is very well known by its world premieres. One of the titles national Ballet is proud the most is Anna Karenina by Russian composer Rodion Shchedrin, as well as The Legend of Ohrid by Serbian composer Stevan Hristić.

List of directors
This is a list of directors of the National Theatre in Belgrade with their term years:

See also 
 List of theatres in Serbia
 List of directors of the National Theatre in Belgrade
 Monuments of Culture of Great Importance
 Tourism in Serbia

References

External links 

 

 

Buildings and structures in Belgrade
Theatres in Belgrade
Opera houses in Serbia
Serbian culture
Cultural Monuments of Great Importance (Serbia)
Belgrade, National Theatre in Belgrade
Event venues established in 1869
Theatres completed in 1869
1869 establishments in Serbia